The 2009 European Individual Speedway Junior Championship will be the 12th UEM Individual Speedway Junior European Championship season. The Final will be place on 11 July 2009 in Tarnów, Poland; it will be fourth Final in Poland, but first time in Tarnów. Defending European Champion is Artur Mroczka from Poland who won in 2008 Final in Stralsund, Germany.

Calendar

Domestic Qualifications

Poland

The Final of Domestic Qualification to Individual Junior European Championship was canceled. Main Commission of Speedway Sport (part of Polish Motor Union) nominated seven riders and one reserve:

 Przemysław Pawlicki (Leszno)
 Sławomir Musielak (Leszno)
 Dawid Lampart (Rzeszów)
 Patryk Dudek (Zielona Góra)
 Maciej Janowski (Wrocław)
 Kacper Gomólski (Gniezno)
 Damian Sperz (Gdańsk)
 Reserve: Marcel Kajzer (Gniezno)

Qualifying round

Teterow
 Qualifying Round
 4 April 2009 (15:15)
  Teterow, Arena am Kellerholz
 Referee:  Susanne Huttinger
 Qualify: 4 + 2R to SF1 and 4 + 2R to SF3
 Change:
 (10)  Daniel Gappmaier → Kajzer
 (11)  Attila Lorincz → None
 (12)  Maxime Mazeau → None

Semi-finals

Final

 The Final
 11 July 2009 (19:15 UTC+2)
  Tarnów, Stadion Miejski (Length: 392 m)
 Referee:  Istvan Darago
 Jury President:  B. Thomsen
 Attendance: 2,000

Riders

Heat details

See also
 2009 Team Speedway Junior European Championship

References

2009
European Individual Junior